Vaidas Čepukaitis (born May 16, 1989) is a professional Lithuanian basketball player. He primarily plays the center and power forward positions.

References 

1989 births
Living people
BC Juventus players
BC Lietkabelis players
BC Nevėžis players
BC Prienai players
BC Wolves players
Lithuanian men's basketball players
Power forwards (basketball)
Small forwards
Sportspeople from Alytus